John Jared Maddux (July 20, 1911 – May 22, 1971) was a Tennessee politician.

Career 
A member of the Tennessee State Senate, he was elected by his colleagues to serve as the 43rd Lieutenant Governor of Tennessee from 1953 to 1959 and again from 1965 to 1967 under Governor Frank G. Clement, longer than any other person except John S. Wilder, who held the office from 1971 to 2007.

The story of how he was elected to his final term is now something of a Tennessee political legend (see Frank Gorrell.) , he is the only person to have served in the office for non-consecutive terms.  He was from Cookeville, Tennessee.

References

Democratic Party Tennessee state senators
Comptrollers of the Treasury of Tennessee
Lieutenant Governors of Tennessee
1911 births
1971 deaths
20th-century American politicians